is a 1972 Japanese film directed by Kōichi Saitō. It was entered into the 22nd Berlin International Film Festival.

Cast
 Keiko Kishi - Woman on parole
 Kenichi Hagiwara - Burglar
 Yoshie Minami - Supervisor
 Rentarō Mikuni - Detective
 Jin Nakayama
 Taiji Tonoyama

References

External links

1972 films
Films directed by Kōichi Saitō
1970s Japanese-language films
1970s Japanese films